Imran Masood (born 21 April 1971) is an Indian politician. He has served as the Chairman of Saharanpur's Municipal Council and MLA from Muzzafarabad seat (now Behat Seat) in Saharanpur District in the UP state assembly.
He was a vice president of Indian National Congress, Uttar Pradesh.
He was a member of Advisory council in Uttar Pradesh Congress.
He was former National secretary of All India Congress Committee (AICC).

Political career 
He contested Lok sabha election and secured 4.10 lakh votes. In March 2014, a video clip surfaced in which Masood was seen threatening the BJP's Prime-ministerial Candidate, Narendra Modi. Masood's partisans claim that this clip was six months old and had been deliberately leaked to polarize the electorate ahead of the Lok Sabha election. BJP's Raghav Lakhanpal defeated him in 2014 Lok Sabha election. He contested 2017 assembly election of UP and lost.

On 29 March 2014, he was arrested by Police for his Hate Speech against Narendra Modi.

In the 2017 UP Vidhan Sabha elections Imran Masood fought from the Nakur Constituency. Even though he was the only Muslim and a coalition candidate he still lost to Dr. Dharam Singh Saini of BJP.
 Candidate India National Congress MP seat Saharanpur yogi call hate speech

Posts held
 Chairman - Nagar Palika Parishad, Saharanpur (2006–07)
 MLA - Uttar Pradesh Legislative Assembly (2007–12)
 Member - Privilege committee of Uttar Pradesh Legislative Assembly (2008–09)
 Vice president of Uttar Pradesh in Indian National Congress (2019-2020)
 Member of advisory council in Uttar Pradesh Congress (2020-2021)
 National secretary of All india Congress committee (AICC) and secretary of Delhi ( 2021-present)

Elections contested

Criminal Cases 

Imran Masood has the following criminal cases pending against him:

1). 295, 153A	Sec. 125 People R Act, Sec. 1(10) SC.ST Act, Crime no.230/14 Police Station Deoband, Saharanpur, Court taking Cognizance - ACJM Deoband, Cognizance date-03-07-14

2). Sec.3/4 PMLA Act, Parivaad no.1/13, Court taking Cognizance - District Court Lucknow, Cognizance date 04-05-2013, Court which charges framed- District Sessions Court Lucknow, Charges framed date 27-07-15

References

 4.http://www.ummid.com/news/2017/March/11.03.2017/imran-masood-loses-nakur-seat-by-3500-votes.html
 5.http://myneta.info/uttarpradesh2017/candidate.php?candidate_id=1085

Uttar Pradesh MLAs 2007–2012
People from Saharanpur district
Living people
1971 births
United Progressive Alliance candidates in the 2014 Indian general election
Indian National Congress politicians from Uttar Pradesh